Margot Elisabeth Dreschel, also spelled Drechsler, or Drexler (17 May 1908 – May/June 1945), was a prison guard at Nazi concentration camps during World War II.

Before her enlistment as an SS auxiliary, she worked at an office in Berlin. On 31 January 1941, Dreschel arrived at Ravensbrück concentration camp to receive guard training. At first she was an Aufseherin, a lower-ranking female guard at Ravensbrück camp in charge of interned women. She trained under Oberaufseherin (Senior Overseer) Johanna Langefeld in 1941, and quickly became an SS-Rapportführerin (Report Overseer), a higher-ranked guard.

Auschwitz-Birkenau
On 27 April 1942, Dreschel was selected for transfer to the newly opened Auschwitz II – Birkenau concentration camp in occupied Poland. Dreschel  began her duties at Birkenau in August 1942 as soon as the women's camp was established there, with women transferred from Auschwitz to Birkenau during expansion. She served under Maria Mandel and worked as an associate of Dr Mengele.

Dreschel was head of all camp offices in Auschwitz. Her appearance was reportedly repellent, as one female Auschwitz prisoner recounted: "camp leader Dreschel was there, her buck teeth sticking out, even when her mouth is closed." Inmates described her as vulgar, thin and ugly. After the war, many survivors testified of her notoriously brutal beatings. She carried out indoor selections wearing a white coat and white gloves, disguised as a doctor.Margot regularly moved between the Auschwitz I camp and Birkenau, and involved herself in selections of women and children to be sent to the gas chambers. On 1 November 1944, she went to Flossenbürg concentration camp as an Oberaufseherin and as a trainer of enlisted overseers. In January 1945, she was moved back to the Ravensbruck subcamp at Neustadt-Glewe, and fled from there in April 1945 as Nazi Germany surrendered.

In May 1945, several former Auschwitz prisoners recognized her on a road from Pirna to Bautzen in the Soviet zone, and took her to the Soviet Military Police. The Soviets condemned her to death and executed her in May or June 1945 by hanging in Bautzen.

See also

 Female guards in Nazi concentration camps

Notes

References
Margot Drexler (1908-1945) biodata .
Brown, D. P.: The Camp Women: The Female Auxiliaries Who Assisted the SS in Running the Nazi Concentration Camp System; Schiffer Publishing 2002; .
 Matthaus, Juergen. Approaching an Auschwitz Survivor: Holocaust History and its Transformations Oxford University Press, 2009; .

1908 births
1945 deaths
Holocaust perpetrators in Poland
People from Ebersbach-Neugersdorf
People from the Kingdom of Saxony
Female guards in Nazi concentration camps
Auschwitz concentration camp personnel
Ravensbrück concentration camp personnel
Flossenbürg concentration camp personnel
Nazis convicted of war crimes
Executed Nazi concentration camp personnel
Executed people from Saxony
Executed German women
Date of death unknown
Nazis executed by the Soviet Union by hanging
Executed mass murderers